The 2001 Thalgo Australian Women's Hardcourts singles was a tennis competition within the 2001 Thalgo Australian Women's Hardcourts, a tennis tournament played on outdoor hard courts at the Hope Island Resort Tennis Centre in Hope Island, Queensland in Australia and was part of Tier III of the 2001 WTA Tour. The tournament ran from 31 December 2000 through 6 January 2001.

Silvija Talaja was the defending champion but lost in the quarterfinals to Silvia Farina Elia.

Justine Henin won in the final 7–6(7–5), 6–4 against Farina Elia.

Seeds
A champion seed is indicated in bold text while text in italics indicates the round in which that seed was eliminated. The top two seeds received a bye to the second round.

  Conchita Martínez (quarterfinals)
  Patty Schnyder (semifinals)
  Silvija Talaja (quarterfinals)
  Tatiana Panova (first round)
  Magüi Serna (second round)
  Meghann Shaughnessy (semifinals)
  Henrieta Nagyová (first round)
  Justine Henin (champion)

Draw

Final

Top half

Bottom half

Qualifying

Seeds

  Marissa Irvin (first round)
  Giulia Casoni (withdrew, moved to the Main Draw)
  Alexandra Stevenson (final round)
  Sandra Načuk (second round)
  Barbara Rittner (Qualifier)
  Maria Vento (first round)
  Rachel McQuillan (first round)
  Janet Lee (second round)
  Cătălina Cristea (second round)

Qualifiers

  Wynne Prakusya
  Barbara Rittner
  Lina Krasnoroutskaya
  Gréta Arn

Draw

First qualifier

Second qualifier

Third qualifier

Fourth qualifier

References
 2001 Thalgo Australian Women's Hardcourts Draw

2001 Thalgo Australian Women's Hardcourts
2001 WTA Tour